The 1975 Argentina rugby union tour of France  was a series of eight matches played by the Argentina national rugby union team in October.

It was the first tour of Argentinian team in France, and the second in Europe.

Matches
Points scoring rules: try 4, conversion 2, penalty, drop and goal from a mark 3 points.

Coste Basque: Lataste; Pécune, Etchenique, Ara, Serre; Vivies, Berrouet; Lassoujade, Bastiat (capt.), Petrissans; Haget e Imbemon (Lourdon); Azarete, Yachvili, Paparemborde. 
Argentina: Sansot; D. Beccar Varela, Travaglini, Rodríguez Jurado, O'Farrell; Porta, Morgan (capt); Mastai, Migúens, Neyra; Bottarini, Fernández; Nicola, Casas, Carluccio. 

  Second division XV: Daubinet; Xaussa, Cieply, Delaigue, Lazartigue; Morot, Barella; Rabatel, Mahe, Rame; Vidal, Jedreziak; Leconte, Lard, Salas. Argentina: García Terán; 0' Farrell, L'Erario, Travaglini, Gauweloose; G. Beccar Varela, Rinaldi; Neyra, Bori, Carracedo; Mangiamelli, Bottarini; Carbone, Correa, Cerioni 

 Languedoc: Benacloi; Harize, Billoc, Badin, Bourkels; Perteil, Barrau; Boffelli, Viel, Verdoulet; Sappa-, Senal; Ducloup, Salette, Chaiivet. Argentina: Sansot; D. Beccar Varela, Rodríguez Jurado, Cappelletti, Gauweloose; Porta, Morgan (c); Neyra, Miguens, Mastai; Bottarini, Fernández; Nicola, Correa, Carluccio. 

 Midi-Pyrénées:: Sarnel; R. Aue, J.P. Aue, Cimarosti, Jacomet; Laporte, Tapie, Massac, Bariolet, Porcel; Saturnín, Junca; Revaillero, Besogne, Cuny. Argentina: García Terán; Gauweloose, L'Erario, Cappelletti, O'Farrell; G. Beccar Varela, Rinaldi; Carracedo, Bori, Miguens; Bottarini, Mangiamelfi; Carbone, Vila, Cerioni.  

Bourges XV  Pommier; Laberzri, Pérez, Laczack, Soula; Auriat, Monar; Kaczarowski,
Dusang, Perón; Decrae, Genois; Dumusois, Garouste, Dalos.  Argentina: Sansot; Gauweloose, Rodríguez Jurado, Cappelletti y, O'Farrell; Porta, Morgan; Neyra, Miguens, Carracedo; Bottarini, Fernández; Nicola, Vila, Cerioni

Sources

Notes 

1975
1975
1975 in Argentine rugby union
1975–76 in French rugby union